Jenius Achai Karib (born 27 March 1993) is a Malaysian professional footballer who plays as a defender for Malaysia Super League club, the Sabah FC and Kinabalu Jaguar FC.

References

External links
 

1993 births
Living people
Malaysian footballers
People from Sabah
Sabah F.C. (Malaysia) players
Association football defenders